Brendan Conan Pereira, also known as "BCP", is an Indian advertising executive.

Early life and education
Brendan Pereira was born on 23 November 1928, to Albert and Louise Pereira. He attended St. Isabel's and St. Mary's High School, both in Mazagaon, Mumbai. In 1945, he enrolled in Sir J.J. Institute of Applied Art, to pursue a Diploma in Applied Art where he learnt block-making, lithography, and photography—as subsidiary subjects. In 1949, he joined L.A. Stronachs Advertising as an apprentice. Later he joined D.J. Keymer (Bensons, OBM, now O&M) as visualiser and assistant to art director P.N. Sarma.

In 1954, he married Therese (née Aranha). In 1956, he left Bombay for the UK for further education and experience. In London, he joined Rapier Design, then Baron Moss, where he was later appointed Art Director. Subsequently, he joined C.Vernon's and worked on a range of products. At the same time, he took courses at the Institute of Practitioners in Advertising.

Professional work
In 1960, he joined Aiyars Advertising, Bombay to work on the Beechams account they had just acquired.  He spent a year with Beechams in London, to learn about their products and their marketing worldwide.  1961, he returned to Aiyars Advertising as Creative Director with the responsibility of all creative work as well as handling the Beecham account. Eventually Aiyars linked with LPE, London as LPE-Aiyars and he was elected to the board.

In March 1972, he left Aiyars Advertising to co-found Chaitra Advertising (now Leo Burnett) along with Walter Saldanha. In 1983, he left Chaitra to form his own consultancy, GLIMA. Clarion Advertising appointed him as a Creative Consultant. In 1992, he supported the formation of Nova Advertising Palace with executives from Clarion and had a long association with this agency as Consultant, Managing Director and shareholder.

In 2001, he retired but continues to do charity work for the church and some NGOs.

Recognition
He was President of Communication Arts Guild (CAG), Mumbai from 1976–1993, and was Inducted to their Hall of Fame in 1993. On 12 January 2014, he received a lifetime achievement award by the Cathedral of the Holy Name Archdiocese, Mumbai.

He lectured at The Advertising Club, taught at St. Xavier's Institute of Communication in Mumbai, National Institute of Design in Ahmedabad, Tata Administrative Services in Pune, Jamnalal Bajaj Institute of Management Studies in Mumbai and The Packaging Institute on advertising, typography, and design.  He was also the first Indian Member of the Art Directors Club of New York.

He published a book of the experiences in four decades of Advertising entitled, Changing Faces.

References

External links 
 Changing Faces (free pdf)

Indian advertising executives
Living people
1928 births
Businesspeople from Mumbai